Vaughn Allen Dunbar (born September 4, 1968) is an American former professional football player who was a running back in the National Football League (NFL) for three seasons.  He played college football for the Indiana Hoosiers, and earned All-American accolades.  A first-round choice in the 1992 NFL draft, he played professionally for the New Orleans Saints and Jacksonville Jaguars of the NFL.

Early years
Dunbar was born in Fort Wayne, Indiana.  He graduated from R. Nelson Snider High School in Fort Wayne, where he was a standout high school football player for the Snider Panthers.

College career
Dunbar first attended Northeastern Oklahoma A&M College, before accepting an athletic scholarship to attend Indiana University Bloomington and play for the Hoosiers teams in 1990 and 1991.  His smooth and shifty running style and physique reminded many commentators of Florida's Emmitt Smith.  With 4.5/4.6 speed in the 40-yard dash, Dunbar made up for the lack of explosive speed with "between the tackles toughness," outstanding balance and vision.  He was one of the first in college to wear a reflective/shaded facemask visor making it difficult for Big Ten defenders to see where his eyes were looking.

Dunbar and fellow Hoosier running back Anthony Thompson brought national media attention to the Hoosiers' often overlooked football program.  As a senior in 1991, he was recognized as a consensus first-team All-American and finished sixth in Heisman Trophy balloting after being ranked second in the nation in rushing yards per game.

1990: 250 carries for 1,224 yards with 13 TD.  16 catches for 122 yards.
1991: 364 carries for 1,805 yards with 12 TD.  29 catches for 263 yards.

Professional career
He finished his NFL career with the Jacksonville Jaguars in 1995. In his three NFL seasons, he compiled 965 rushing yards and five touchdowns on 267 carries.

Dunbar was subsequently a first round draft pick of the XFL's San Francisco Demons in 2001. He started all games for the first 4 weeks but was released after gaining just 29 yards on 25 carries. He subsequently retired from professional football.

Life after football
Dunbar now works for Precision Hose, Inc. in Stone Mountain, Georgia.
And has 3 children and is divorced.

See also
 List of college football yearly rushing leaders

References

1968 births
Living people
All-American college football players
American football running backs
Indiana Hoosiers football players
Jacksonville Jaguars players
New Orleans Saints players
San Francisco Demons players
Northeastern Oklahoma A&M Golden Norsemen football players
Players of American football from Fort Wayne, Indiana